Cirina is a genus of moths in the family Saturniidae.

Species
Cirina butyrospermi (Vuillet, 1911)
Cirina forda (Westwood, 1849)

References

External links

Saturniinae